Tunde Ke Kabab, also known as Buffalo meat galouti kebab, is a dish made out of minced meat which is popular in Lucknow, India. It is part of Awadhi cuisine. It is said to incorporate 160 spices. Ingredients include finely minced Goat meat, plain yogurt, garam masala, grated ginger, crushed garlic, ground cardamom, powdered cloves, melted ghee, dried mint, small onions cut into rings, vinegar, saffron, rose water, sugar, lime. Tunde ke kabab were introduced to the Nawab of Awadh Wajid Ali Shah. Lucknow’s iconic eating joint Tunday Kababi, started in 1905, is famous for serving buffalo meat galouti kebab.

Origin
During the 17th century, in the Awadh state under the Mughals in Northern India, one of the members related to the Nawabs of Awadh held a competition for the local Khansamahs to prepare Kebabs as soft as possible to chew. One of the khansamah named Haji Murad Ali  who was also Tunda' (one armed), prepared the dish with using at least 100 Indian and exotic spices including some aphrodisiacs. The Nawab found the kebabs so delicious, that he immediately declared Murad as the winner. Eventually the kebabs became so popular in Awadh and other Mughal courts that it came to be known as Tunday ke Kebab''', literally meaning One armed man's Kebabs''.

See also
 Kebab

References

External links
 Recipe

North Indian cuisine
Mughlai cuisine
Desi cuisine
Uttar Pradeshi cuisine
Awadhi cuisine